The Malawian Defence Force is the state military organisation responsible for defending Malawi. It originated from elements of the British King's African Rifles, colonial units formed before independence in 1964.

The military is organized under the purview of the Ministry of Defence.

Malawi Army
Before independence, Malawi depended for its military supplies on the barracks in Rhodesia, as British colonial military logistics was usually organized on a continental basis, rather than at the level of individual colonies. The Malawi Rifles were formed when the country gained its independence from the United Kingdom in 1964. Its first battalion was formed from the 1st Battalion, King's African Rifles. On independence the battalion became 1st Battalion, The Malawi Rifles (King's African Rifles). They were based at what became the headquarters of the Malawi Army at Cobbe Barracks, Zomba. Cobbe Barracks had been named in May 1958 for British General Alexander Cobbe VC, who had served with the King's African Rifles. The Rifles were reportedly at a strength of 2,000 men at independence. On 6 July 1966 Malawi became a republic and Kamuzu Banda became the first president. After the swearing in ceremony his first duty was to present the battalion with his own presidential colour and the new regimental colour. It was under the leadership of Brigadier Paul Lewis, a British expatriate; Welsh Colonel Dudley Thornton commanded 1965-67. In 1966, about 60% of the officers in the battalion were former non-commissioned officers.

After the Cabinet Crisis of 1964, the Malawi Army destroyed Henry Chipembere's insurrection in Mangochi District and Machinga District in 1965. Another of the ministers ousted during the Cabinet Crisis was Yatuta Chisiza. Chisiza fled to Tanzania, and founded the Socialist League of Malawi, the most radical Malawian opposition party. He also began to conduct guerilla operations against the Banda regime. In 1967 Chisiza and nine others entered Mwanza District from Tanzania. In the following clash with the Army and Young Pioneers on 9 October 1967 he and two other members of insurgent forces were killed; five were captured; and the others fled.

In 1970 the International Institute for Strategic Studies listed the Army as comprising one infantry battalion [1 MR at Zomba] and supporting services, having a strength of 1,150.

Malawi was allied with Portugal during the Mozambican War of Independence (1964–74), and the Malawi Army consequently cooperated with the Portuguese Army to secure the Mozambican-Malawian border and arrest FRELIMO rebels. Following FRELIMO's victory and the independence of Mozambique, several Portuguese colonial secret police agents as well as FRELIMO deserters joined the Malawian Army.

Gurkha officer John "Johnny" Clements was advanced to Acting Brigadier in May 1971, and commanded the Malawi Army until September 1972. Thereupon the Army's first black commander, Brigadier Graciano Matewere was appointed. Hastings Banda promoted Matewere instantly to Major General after the resolution of the South African Airways hijacking in Blantyre in 1972. Matewere was retired by Banda in 1980 and died in 2001.

Declassified Defense Intelligence Agency reporting from 1985 states that "there is also a military college [likely the Kamuzu Military College, at Salima that is probably one of the finest, most efficiently organized, and operated military training schools in Sub-Saharan Africa. [It] conducts recruit training, numerous enlisted courses, officer cadet courses, [a] platoon leader course, company commanders course (sic), communications courses, NCO courses, a catering course, and will add a staff officers course in the future." The same source listed the Army Commander as General Melvin Khanga, with the deputy commander, Lieutenant General Issac Yohane, and the Director of Training Major General Wilfred Mponela.

Transition to democracy 
In 1992-93, the army played a vital role in dismantling the dictatorship of Kamuzu Banda.

After the 8 March 1992 pastoral letter:
There were public demonstrations in support of the bishops - notably at the University in Blantyre and Zomba, where soldiers indicated their support for the students and deterred violent police action against the protesters. This was the first sign of the army's future political role. In May 1992 student protesters were joined by striking workers in Blantyre. In two days of riots dozens of protesters were killed by armed police and Young Pioneers.

In December 1992:
..the army intervened to disarm the MYP forcibly. A bar-room argument in ..Mzuzu ended with Young Pioneers shooting two soldiers dead. The middle-ranking and junior officers effectively mutinied against the army commander, General Isaac Yohane, attacking the Ministry of Youth and other MYP installations in Lilongwe, as well as looting the MCP headquarters. The army then moved into MYP bases throughout the country.
The operation was called "Bwezani" which means "taking back" or "returning". This event was vital in the history of the Malawi Army.

State Department International Military Education and Training documentation from Fiscal Year 2003 indicates the United States trained army personnel from the 2nd Battalion, Malawi Rifles, probably at Kamuzu Barracks, Lilongwe, 3rd Battalion, Malawi Rifles (Moyale Barracks, Mzuzu), the Parachute Battalion, and the Combat Support Battalion (Mvera).

In July 2004 General Joseph Chimbayo was succeeded by Marko Chiziko. In 2011 General Chiziko was succeeded by Henry Odillo as MDF Commander.

On 5 April 2012 when President Bingu wa Mutharika died, there were rumours of an attempted constitutional coup intended to prevent vice-president Joyce Banda from becoming president as outlined by the constitution. The military, under General Henry Odillo, stepped in and vowed to support and uphold the constitution of Malawi. They reportedly stationed security members at Banda's residence during the news of Mutharika's death. This level of professionalism had a direct impact on the smooth transition of power.

Malawi has signed the initial agreements joining the SADC Standby Brigade, the southern African component of the African Standby Force.

The Force Intervention Brigade of the United Nations Organization Stabilization Mission in the Democratic Republic of the Congo was authorized by the United Nations Security Council on 28 March 2013 through Resolution 2098. Its first 2,550 troops were drawn almost equally from Malawi, the Tanzania People's Defence Force, and the South African National Defence Force.

After Peter Mutharika became President in 2014, he replaced the Defence Force commander four times in six years. On August 4, 2014, General Henry Odillo handed over to General Ignaious Maulana, the former Chief of Military Operations. In July–August 2016, General Maulana was replaced by his former deputy Griffin Supuni-Phiri. Another change occurred in 2109. In March 2020, General Vincent Nundwe, who had won praise for the army's handling of six months of protests over Mutharika's election victory, was dismissed and replaced by Major General Andrew Lapken Namathanga, the former Air Force commander. Six months later, the new President, Lazarus Chakwera, reinstated Nundwe.

On 14 November 2018, during FIB Rotation VI, an officer, sergeant, corporal, and three soldiers of the MDF were killed in action in the Congo.

Armoured fighting vehicles

Artillery

Air Force
The Malawi Air Force was established with German help in 1976 with the delivery of six single-engined Dornier Do 27s and eight Do 28 light twins in 1976-1980. Also in the same era the air force received an Alouette III, an AS 350 and an AS 355 Ecureuil, as well as three SA 330 H/L Puma Helicopters from France. A single BAe 125-800 was delivered in 1986. Four Dornier 228 light twin turbo props were acquired between 1986 and 1989 in part to allow disposal of the older Dornier products. In 1990 two Douglas C-47 with PT6A turboprops were delivered from the US.

Current aircraft

Retired aircraft 
Previous aircraft that have been placed in storage or removed from service include the Basler BT-67, the Dornier Do27-A, the  British Aerospace 125, the King Air 90, AS365 Dauphin, and the Alouette III.

Navy
As a landlocked country, Malawi has a very small Navy with no sizeable military craft. Malawi's naval force only operates on Lake Malawi and is based at Monkey Bay. The Malawi Navy was organized in the early 1970s, with the help of the Navy of Portugal that ceded part of its boats of the Nyassa Flotilla operating from the then Portuguese province of Mozambique. In some cases, the gunboats of the Malawian Navy were initially crewed by Portuguese. In 2007, the navy had 220 personnel, and operated the following vessels:

Patrol boats
1 Namacurra-class harbour patrol boat (P 704 Kaning'a, formerly Y 1520), transferred from South Africa in 1988
1 Antares-class patrol boat (P 703 Kasungu, formerly Chikala), out of service since 1993
Service craft
1 unknown-type Landing Craft Mechanized (P 702 Chikoko I), date of entry into service unknown
12 Buccaneer Inflatables Buccaneer Legend-type rigid-hulled inflatable launches, in service since 1993

See also

 Nyasaland in World War II
 Malawi Armed Forces College FC
 Kamuzu Barracks FC, Lilongwe

Notes

References 
 (date was 1 May 1994; accessed April 2021)

 World Aircraft Information Files. Brightstar Publishing, London. File 337 Sheet 02
 World Aircraft Information Files. Brightstar Publishing, London. File 340 Sheet 05

Further reading 
Crosby, Cynthia A. Historical Dictionary of Malaŵi. Vol. 54. Scarecrow Press, 1993. "Army" entry.
Nelson, Harold D., Malawi: A Country Study, Library of Congress, Federal Research Division, Washington DC, 1975.
Tim Lovering, "RACE AND HIERARCHY IN BRITAIN'S COLONIAL ARMY IN NYASALAND (MALAWI), 1891-1964," Journal of the Society for Army Historical Research, Vol. 91, No. 366 (Summer 2013), pp. 120–142.
Lieutenant Colonel A.D. Namangale psc, "A Brief History of the Malawi Rifles to Mark the Centenary of the Formation of the King's African Rifles 1902-2002." LMalawi Defence Forces Headquarters. 22 page illus. booklet. 2002. K200.
Jonathan Newell, "An African army under pressure: The politicisation of the Malawi army and ‘Operation Bwezani’, 1992–93, Small Wars and Insurgencies, Vol. 6, No. 2, 1995, pp159–182, https://doi.org/10.1080/09592319508423107. 
James Njoloma, "The Malaŵi Army : a hundred years today, [Lilongwe?] : J. Njoloma, [1991] (details from WorldCat)
Hartone L. Phiri, "The Rebellion of Enlisted Personnel and Democratisation in Malawi"  Naval Postgraduate School, 2011

Tim Stapleton. "'Bad Boys': Infiltration and Sedition in the African Military Units of the Central African Federation (Malawi, Zambia and Zimbabwe) 1953-163." The Journal of Military History 73, no.4 (2009): 1167–1193.

Also relevant:
Brig. Gen. Marcel R.D. Chirwa, Malawi Security Sector Reform: A Return to Regular Order, Centre for Peace and Security Management, Lilongwe, Malawi, undated
Brig. Gen. Marcel R.D. Chirwa, Lake Malawi or Lake Nyasa: The Contested Name and Boundary between Landlocked Malawi and Tanzania, Centre for Peace and Security Management, Lilongwe, Malawi, August 2020

External links
Official website of the Ministry of Defence of Malawi